Winsted is a census-designated place and an incorporated city in Litchfield County, Connecticut,  United States. It is part of the town of Winchester. The population of Winsted was 7,712 at the 2010 census, out of 11,242 in the entire town of Winchester.

History

Settled in 1750, the city of Winsted was formed at the junction of the Mad River and Still River and was one of the first mill towns in Connecticut. Manufactured products started with scythes at the Winsted Manufacturing Company in 1792. The city is within the town of Winchester, and its name derives from the fact that it is the business center for the towns of Winchester and Barkhamsted.

Winsted, along with New Haven, Connecticut, was a center for the production of mechanical clocks in the 1900s. The Gilbert Clock Company, located along the Still River north of town, was founded in 1871 by William L. Gilbert (1806–1890) and became one of the largest clock companies in the world around the start of the 20th century.

The Winsted post office contains an oil on canvas mural, Lincoln's Arbiter Settles the Winsted Post Office Controversy, painted by muralist Amy Jones in 1938. Federally commissioned murals were produced from 1934 to 1943 in the United States through the Section of Painting and Sculpture, later called the Section of Fine Arts, of the Treasury Department.

The Gilbert School, originally endowed with more than $600,000 by William L. Gilbert, is a private secondary school that serves as the public high school for the town of Winchester.

In 1955, Hurricane Connie and Hurricane Diane passed over Connecticut within one week, flooding the Mad River and Still River through downtown. This damaged the buildings between Main Street and the river such that all buildings on that side of Main Street through the center of town were subsequently removed and Main Street widened to four lanes. The buildings on the north side of Main Street for the most part survived and were repaired. Further downstream, the Still River flowed between the buildings of the Gilbert Clock Company. The flooding caused extensive damage to their buildings, and this was the final blow to a company which was already in poor financial condition.

Northwestern Connecticut Community College was founded in 1965 by Winsted residents, including Ralph Nader's older brother, Shafeek. It occupies the original Gilbert School building. NCCC was one of the first four community colleges in Connecticut, and is accredited by both the Connecticut Board of Governors for Higher Education and by the New England Association of Schools and Colleges. The Northwestern Community College Foundation was incorporated in 1981 to support the mission of Northwestern Connecticut Community College. NCCF generates private funds for the purpose of benefiting the students attending NCCC and the community of Winsted.

In 2013, Henry Centrella, the former city finance director, was served a complaint which stated that over $2.2 million was misappropriated during his 30-year tenure.

Pictures

Geography

Winsted sits in the eastern part of the town of Winchester at the confluence of the Still River and Mad River. This Mad River is one of seven rivers with the same name in New England, one other of which is also in Connecticut. The Still River continues north as a tributary of the Farmington River and is part of the Connecticut River watershed.

The city is laid out in a horseshoe-shaped valley ringed by seven hills; two other hills stand amid this, making a total of nine named hills.

There are five stone churches in a crescent from east to west. In their exact center is the Castle Tower Civil War monument, a stone tower of over 40 feet erected in 1890.

The city is crossed by U.S. Route 44, Connecticut Route 8, Connecticut Route 183 and Connecticut Route 263. US 44 leads southeast  to Hartford, the state capital, and northwest  to North Canaan.

Demographics

As of the census of 2010, there were 7,712 people, 3,346 households, and 1,920 families residing in the CDP. There were 3,828 housing units, of which 482, or 12.6%, were vacant. The racial makeup of the CDP was 91.6% White, 2.2% African American, 0.3% Native American, 1.3% Asian, 2.7% some other race, and 2.0% from two or more races. Hispanic or Latino people of any race were 6.5% of the population.

Of the 3,346 households in the community, 28.3% had children under the age of 18 living with them, 38.7% were headed by married couples living together, 13.6% had a female householder with no husband present, and 42.6% were non-families. 35.2% of all households were made up of individuals, and 13.4% were someone living alone who was 65 years of age or older. The average household size was 2.28, and the average family size was 2.95.

21.5% of the CDP population were under the age of 18, 8.7% were from 18 to 24, 24.6% were from 25 to 44, 30.1% were from 45 to 64, and 15.1% were 65 years of age or older. The median age was 41.3 years. For every 100 females, there were 94.4 males. For every 100 females age 18 and over, there were 92.2 males.

For the period 2013–2017, the estimated median annual income for a household in the CDP was $45,597, and the median income for a family was $58,962. Male full-time workers had a median income of $41,842 versus $45,208 for females. About 20.1% of families and 23.5% of the population were living below the poverty line, including 31.8% of people under the age of 18 and 13.0% of those age 65 or over.

Public transportation
The closest major airport is Bradley International Airport (BDL),  to the east in Windsor Locks, Connecticut. Amtrak stations within a 30-mile radius include Windsor (WND), Hartford (HFD), Berlin (BER), and Springfield, Massachusetts (SPG). Greyhound Lines also has a bus station.

Public transportation service is provided by the Northwestern Connecticut Transit District, which operates a weekday bus service and a dial-a-ride service.

Education

Winchester Public Schools is the public school district for elementary grades while Gilbert School serves as the public school for secondary grades. Prior to 2011 middle school students went to the Winchester district.

Northwestern Regional School District No. 7 maintains Northwestern Regional High School, which is partly in Winsted. However the school does not serve residents of Winchester.

There is a charter school, Explorations Charter School.

There is also was a parochial Catholic school, St. Anthony School, of the Roman Catholic Diocese of Hartford. It opened in 1865.  it had about 200 students. By 2020 this figure declined to 90. It closed in 2020. At the time it was the oldest school continually operated by the archdiocese.

Northwestern Connecticut Community College is in Winsted.

Beardsley Library and the Memorial Library is the local public library. Mrs. Eliot Beardsley donated $10,000 to establish the library. The buying of the land was funded by Jenison Whiting, who submitted a bequest in 1898, with the first building built the following year.

Notable people

 Crane Brinton, historian
 James J. Casey, politician
 James P. Glynn, congressman
 John Groppo, businessman and politician
 David Halberstam, journalist and author
 Mason Hale, educator
 Samuel B. Horne (1843–1928), Medal of Honor recipient in the American Civil War, entered service in Winsted and is buried there
 Arphaxed Loomis, congressman
 Ralph Nader, author and activist
 Rose Nader, activist
 Henry R. Pease, senator
 Charles H. Smith, historian of science
 James Wakefield (1825–1910), congressman

References

External links

 Town of Winchester official website
 Online independent community newspaper
 Beardsley & Memorial Library
 Winchester Historical Society & Museum
 Winsted Area Ambulance Association 
 Winsted Fire Department
 Gilbert School

Census-designated places in Litchfield County, Connecticut
Cities in Litchfield County, Connecticut
Cities in Connecticut
Winchester, Connecticut
Cities in the New York metropolitan area
Census-designated places in Connecticut